The Serra dos Parecis State Park was a state park in the state of Rondônia, Brazil.
It was meant to protect an area of Amazon rainforest, but after being abandoned for twenty years it was cancelled in 2010.

Location

The Serra dos Parecis State Park was in the municipality of Alto Alegre dos Parecis, Rondônia.
The park was in the Amazon biome.
Vegetation was 73.56% open rainforest, 19.38% savanna and 7.06% seasonal semi-deciduous forest.

History

The Serra dos Parecis State Park was created by state decree 4,570 of 23 March 1990.
It was administered by the Secretaria de Estado do Desenvolvimento Ambiental.
The park was one of several conservation units created in 1990 under PLANAFLORO, subsequently abandoned to land grabbing and deforestation, and then cancelled.

On 13 July 2010 an extraordinary session of the Legislative Assembly of Rondônia convened by Governor João Cahulla approved repeal of the decrees that had created six protected areas.
These were the Rio Roosevelt State Forest, Laranjeiras State Forest, Candeias State Park, Serra dos Parecis State Park, Rio Mequéns State Forest and Rio São Domingos State Forest.
The decree creating the park was revoked by law 588 of 19 July 2010, which meant that the park is now legally defunct.

Notes

Sources

State parks of Brazil
Protected areas established in 1990
1990 establishments in Brazil
Protected areas of Rondônia